The Mixed team aerials competition at the FIS Freestyle Ski and Snowboarding World Championships 2023 was held on 19 February 2023.

Results
The first run was started at 14:30 and the second run at 15:05.

References

Mixed team aerials